Charles John Cornish (28 September 1858 – 30 January 1906) was an English naturalist and author.

Life
Born on 28 September 1858 at Salcombe House, near Sidmouth, the residence of his grandfather, Charles John Cornish, J.P., D.L., was eldest son of Charles John Cornish, then curate of Sidbury, Devon, by his first wife, Anne Charlotte Western (died 1887). He was brought up at Debenham, Suffolk, where his father became vicar in 1859. In 1872 he entered Charterhouse School as a gownboy, and left in 1876. After time as a private tutor, he entered Hertford College, Oxford, as a commoner in 1881, was elected Brunsell exhibitioner in 1882 and Lusby scholar in 1883. In the same year he obtained a blue in association football, a second class in classical moderations in 1883, and a second class in literae humaniores in 1885.

In 1885, Cornish was appointed assistant classical master at St Paul's School, London, a position he held for the rest of his life. Soon after coming to London he began to write articles on natural history and country life, and in 1890 became a regular contributor to The Spectator, and later to Country Life.

Cornish lived at Orford House, Chiswick Mall, beside the river Thames, when he wrote The Naturalist on the Thames in 1902.

Cornish died at Worthing on 30 January 1906, the cause originating in a shooting accident many years before. After cremation his ashes were interred at Salcombe Regis, near Sidmouth, and a mural tablet to his memory was placed in the parish church.

Works
Many of Cornish's articles re-appeared in book form. He wrote:

 The New Forest, 1894. 
 The Isle of Wight, 1895. 
 Life at the Zoo, A work which made him widely known,1895
 Wild England of To-day, and the Wild Life in it, 1895.
 Animals at Work and Play, 1896. 2nd edition, 1897
 Nights with an Old Gunner, 1897. 
 
 The Naturalist on the Thames, 1902. 
 Sir William Henry Flower, a Personal Memoir, 1904.

He collaborated with others in Living Animals of the World (2 vols. 1901-2). Animal Artisans and other Studies of Birds and Beasts, with a memoir by his widow, was published in 1907.

Family
Cornish married in 1893 Edith, eldest daughter of John Isaac Thornycroft, by whom he had one daughter.

Notes

Attribution

External links
 
 
 
 

1858 births
1906 deaths
Schoolteachers from Devon
English naturalists
19th-century English non-fiction writers
20th-century English non-fiction writers
English nature writers
People from Sidmouth
People from Mid Suffolk District
People educated at Charterhouse School
Alumni of Hertford College, Oxford
The Spectator people